Bosc de Virós (or Virós-Vallferrera) is a ski resort for Nordic skiing in the town of Bordes de Virós, in the municipality of Alins, in Catalonia, opened in 2001. It's located in the Alt Pirineu Natural Park.

The Gall Fer refuge is the base for all activities, including hosting service for 25 people and a restaurant.

 Total of cross-country skiing trails: 28 km
 Longest cross-country skiing trail: 12 km
 Sled-dog circuit: 12 km

References

External links
website

Ski areas and resorts in Catalonia